Euchalcia aureolineata is a moth of the family Noctuidae. It has been recorded from Syria and Israel.

Adults are on wing in April. There is one generation per year.

External links
Plusiinae of Israel

Plusiinae
Moths of the Middle East